Earl Dwire (October 3, 1883 – January 16, 1940), born Earl Dean Dwire, was an American character actor who appeared in more than 150 movies between 1921 and his death in 1940. 

Dwire acted for three years in stock theater with companies in Portland and Seattle. In December 1912, he joined the American Theater company in Spokane, Washington, and shortly after was named the company's manager when the previous manager resigned. In 1921, he acted with, and was the director of, the Wright Players.

Noted for his almost frightening long face, Dwire worked mainly as a villain in westerns, including Riders of Destiny (1933) with John Wayne  in the first singing cowboy movie and The Trail Beyond (1934) opposite Wayne, Noah Beery, Sr., and Noah Beery, Jr. He enjoys a particularly large showcase opposite John Wayne and Gabby Hayes in The Lawless Frontier (1934). He also appeared in Bob Steele vehicles such as Alias John Law (1935).

Selected filmography

The Kingfisher's Roost (1921) - Dave Butler (the Grocer)
Dugan of the Badlands (1931) - Lang
Alias – the Bad Man (1931) - Townsman (uncredited)
The Montana Kid (1931) - Deputy (uncredited)
Oklahoma Jim (1931) - Cavalry Sergeant
Ghost City (1932) - Barfly (uncredited)
Law of the West (1932) - Henchman Butch
Tangled Fortunes (1932) - Townsman (uncredited)
Riders of the Desert (1932) - Bill - A Ranger (uncredited)
The Man from Hell's Edges (1932) - Morgan - Henchman
Mason of the Mounted (1932) - Henchman Dwire (uncredited)
Law of the North (1932) - Deputy (uncredited)
Honor of the Mounted (1932) - Deputy (uncredited)
Son of Oklahoma (1932) - Ray Brent
Klondike (1932) - Jury Foreman (uncredited)
Broadway to Cheyenne (1932) - Cattleman
 Hidden Valley (1932) - Prosecuting Attorney (uncredited)
Texas Buddies (1932) - Hank, the Liveryman (uncredited)
Young Blood (1932) - Clearwater Station Agent (uncredited)
King Kong (1933) - New York Theatregoer (uncredited)
 The Fugitive (1933) - Henchman Spike
Rainbow Ranch (1933) - Earl - Deputy (uncredited)
Galloping Romeo (1933) - Pete Manning - Express Agent
 Her Forgotten Past (1933) - Henchman (uncredited)
Riders of Destiny (1933) - Slip Morgan
The Lucky Texan (1934) - Sheriff Miller
West of the Divide (1934) - Sheriff
Blue Steel (1934) - Henchman
The Man from Utah (1934) - Rodeo Announcer (uncredited)
Randy Rides Alone (1934) - Sheriff
Young Eagles (1934, Serial) - William Thayer [Ch. 3] (uncredited)
The Star Packer (1934) - Henchman Mason
The Tonto Kid (1934) - Deputy George (uncredited)
Fighting Through (1934) - Barfly (uncredited)
The Dude Ranger (1934) - Train Passenger (uncredited)
The Trail Beyond (1934) - Henchman Benoit
The Lawless Frontier (1934) - Pandro Zanti Posing as Don Yorba
'Neath the Arizona Skies (1934) - Tom (Nina's Father) (uncredited)
Western Justice (1934) - Doctor (uncredited)
Unconquered Bandit (1935) - Pedro Gonzales
Wolf Riders (1935) - Red Wolf
Big Calibre (1935) - Sheriff of Gladstone
Born to Battle (1935) - George Powell
The Pecos Kid (1935) - Jose
Smokey Smith (1935) - Sheriff
 Wagon Trail (1935) - Deputy Joe Larkin
The Miracle Rider (1935) - Indian Scout - Prologue (uncredited)
Tombstone Terror (1935) - Regan
Social Error (1935) - Mr. Merton
Toll of the Desert (1935) - Joe Carson
Fighting Pioneers (1935) - Sergeant Luke
The New Adventures of Tarzan (1935, Serial) - Expatriate Scientist [Chs. 8-10] (uncredited)
Justice of the Range (1935) - Townsman (uncredited)
Saddle Aces (1935) - Sloan aka El Canejo
The Dawn Rider (1935) - Pete (Expressman)
Danger Ahead (1935) - Detective Sergeant
Paradise Canyon (1935) - Sheriff #2 - Arizona (uncredited)
Sundown Saunders (1935) - Sheriff Baker
Westward Ho (1935) - Townsman Notifying Vigilantes (uncredited)
No Man's Range (1935) - Phony Ed Oliver
Cappy Ricks Returns (1935) - Spy in Office (uncredited)
Confidential (1935) - Secretary (uncredited)
The Rider of the Law (1935) - Razor Tolliver
The New Frontier (1935) - Pat Miller (uncredited)
Between Men (1935) - Trent
Lawless Range (1935) - Emmett
Alias John Law (1935) - The Kootney Kid
 The Last of the Clintons (1935) - Pete - Henchman
The Courageous Avenger (1935) - Prisoner
The Fighting Coward (1935) - Police Chief John Russell
Step on It (1936) - Frank Banning
The Kid Ranger (1936) - Steve Brent
Ghost Town (1936) - Jim McCall
Ridin' On (1936) - Buck O'Nell
King of the Pecos (1936) - Rancher (uncredited)
Wildcat Saunders (1936) - Steve - Henchman (uncredited)
King of the Pecos (1936) - Rancher (uncredited)
The Millionaire Kid (1936) - Black
Caryl of the Mountains (1936) - Captain Bradshaw
 Desert Justice (1936) - Hansen - Police Commissioner
Roamin' Wild (1936) - Jim Madison
 The Speed Reporter (1936) - Publisher John Parker
Pinto Rustlers (1936) - Bud Walton
Gun Grit (1936) - Uncle Joe Hess
The Rogues' Tavern (1936) - Morgan
The Crooked Trail (1936) - Miner (uncredited)
 Idaho Kid (1936) - Clint Hollister
Santa Fe Bound (1936) - Tibbets
Oh, Susanna! (1936) - Excited Sage City Townsman (uncredited)
Tundra (1936) - Trading Post Keeper
Cavalcade of the West (1936) - George Christman
Cavalry (1936) - Raid Leader (uncredited)
Law and Lead (1936) - Dad Hawley
The Gun Ranger (1936) - Bud Cooper
Song of the Gringo (1936) - The Chief (uncredited)
Career Woman (1936) - Townsman (uncredited)
Stormy Trails (1936) - Lawyer Steve Barick
Arizona Days (1937) - Joe Workman
The Great O'Malley (1937) - First Judge (uncredited)
The Gambling Terror (1937) - Homer Bradley
Two Wise Maids (1937) - Minor Role (uncredited)
Paradise Express (1937) - Townsman in Café (uncredited)
Trouble in Texas (1937) - Barker
Git Along Little Dogies (1937) - Townsman (uncredited)
Lightnin' Crandall (1937) - Parson Durkin
The Man Who Found Himself (1937) - Joe, the Train Dispatcher (uncredited)
Hittin' the Trail (1937) - James Clark
The Trusted Outlaw (1937) - Jim Swain
Fly-Away Baby (1937) - Globe Chop House Waiter (uncredited)
Riders of the Rockies (1937) - Jeff Jeffries
Doomed at Sundown (1937) - Butch Brawley
Galloping Dynamite (1937) - Pop
Empty Holsters (1937) - Doc Eagan
 Riders of the Dawn (1937) - Two-Gun Gardner
They Won't Forget (1937) - Jury Foreman (uncredited)
The Toast of New York (1937) - Member of the Board of Directors (uncredited)
The Mystery of the Hooded Horsemen (1937) - Sheriff Walker
Atlantic Flight (1937) - Dr. Harvey (uncredited)
Varsity Show (1937) - Professor (uncredited)
Radio Patrol (1937, Serial) - Jeremiah Crockett
Alcatraz Island (1937) - Third Trial Judge Robert Tremaine (uncredited)
Trouble at Midnight (1937) - Henry Goff
Danger Valley (1937) - Hardrock
Born to the West (1937) - Cowhand (uncredited)
Young Dynamite (1937) - Finnegan
Romance of the Rockies (1937) - Henchman Trigger
The Purple Vigilantes (1938) - David Ross
The Old Barn Dance (1938) - Clem Handley
Daredevil Drivers (1938) - Mr. Perkins
Assassin of Youth (1938) - Henry 'Pop' Brady
Accidents Will Happen (1938) - Dr. Faris
Outlaws of Sonora (1938) - Jake, the Banker (uncredited)
Under Western Stars (1938) - Mayor Biggs
Two Gun Justice (1938) - Old-Timer
Six Shootin' Sheriff (1938) - Wild Bill Holman
The Great Adventures of Wild Bill Hickok (1938, Serial) - Jenkins (Ch. 1) (uncredited)
Gold Mine in the Sky (1938) - Station Agent (uncredited)
The Amazing Dr. Clitterhouse (1938) - Surgeon (uncredited)
The Man from Music Mountain (1938) - Martin
The Mysterious Rider (1938) - Sheriff Burley
Six-Gun Trail (1938) - Henchman, stock footage (uncredited)
Angels with Dirty Faces (1938) - Priest (uncredited)
Devil's Island (1939) - Priest (uncredited)
Lincoln in the White House (1939, Short) - (uncredited)
The Oklahoma Kid (1939) - Relay Station Man (uncredited)
Southward Ho (1939) - Dan - Wounded Storekeeper (uncredited)
On Trial (1939) - Judge
Timber Stampede (1939) - Henry Clay Baylor
The Star Maker (1939) - Mac, the Accountant
The Arizona Kid (1939) - Dr. Jason Radford
Pride of the Blue Grass (1939) - Dr. Holmes (uncredited)
Private Detective (1939) - Justice of the Peace (scenes deleted)
His Girl Friday (1940) - Pete Davis (uncredited)
Granny Get Your Gun (1940) - Jake - Checkers Player (uncredited)
Flash Gordon Conquers the Universe (1940, Serial) - Janda [Ch. 1]
King of the Lumberjacks (1940) - Dr. Vance (final film role)

References

External links

 
 

1883 births
1940 deaths
American male film actors
Male actors from Illinois
Male Western (genre) film actors
20th-century American male actors
RKO Pictures contract players
American male stage actors